Marharyta Ryhorauna Makhneva, née Tsishkevich, ; Łacinka: Marharyta Ryhoraŭna Machnieva (Ciškievič); born 13 February 1992) is a Belarusian sprint canoeist. She won two gold medals at the 2015 World Championships (K-2 200 m and K-4 500 m) and the bronze medal in Women's K-4 500 metres at the 2016 Summer Olympics. She won a silver medal at the 2020 Summer Olympics, in Women's K-4 500 metres.

Career
Tsishkevich represented Belarus at the 2012 Summer Olympics in London, where she competed only in two individual sprint kayak events. For her first event, the women's K-1 500 metres, she advanced directly into the semi-final rounds, after placing sixth in the heats, with a time of 2:01.216. She was disqualified from the second semi-final race for breaking the four-metre "centre-lane" rule. In the first ever women's K-1 200 metres, Tsishkevich repeated her last-place finish in the same heat by approximately twenty-one hundredths of a second (0.21) behind Denmark's Henriette Engel Hansen, clocking at 43.033 seconds.

At the 2016 Summer Olympics in Rio de Janeiro, Makhneva won bronze in the women's K-4 500 metres with Volha Khudzenka, Nadzeya Liapeshka, and Maryna Litvinchuk.

References

External links

NBC Olympics Profile

1992 births
Belarusian female canoeists
Living people
Olympic canoeists of Belarus
Canoeists at the 2012 Summer Olympics
Canoeists at the 2016 Summer Olympics
Canoeists at the 2020 Summer Olympics
People from Chojniki District
Medalists at the 2016 Summer Olympics
Medalists at the 2020 Summer Olympics
Olympic silver medalists for Belarus
Olympic bronze medalists for Belarus
Olympic medalists in canoeing
Canoeists at the 2015 European Games
Canoeists at the 2019 European Games
European Games medalists in canoeing
European Games gold medalists for Belarus
European Games silver medalists for Belarus
Universiade medalists in canoeing
Universiade gold medalists for Belarus
Universiade silver medalists for Belarus
ICF Canoe Sprint World Championships medalists in kayak
Sportspeople from Gomel Region